Presidential elections were held in Rwanda on 4 August 2017. The incumbent President of Rwanda, Paul Kagame, was re-elected to a third seven-year term with 98.79% of the vote.

Background
A referendum in 2015 approved constitutional amendments that allow incumbent President Paul Kagame to run for a third term in office in 2017, as well as shortening presidential terms from seven to five years, although the latter change would not come into effect until 2024.

Electoral system
The President of Rwanda is elected in one round of voting by plurality.

Candidates
Kagame announced that he would run for a third term in a televised address to mark the start of 2016, saying "You requested me to lead the country again after 2017. Given the importance and consideration you attach to this, I can only accept. But I don't think that what we need is an eternal leader."

In February 2017, Philippe Mpayimana announced his candidacy as an independent candidate. A former journalist and author, he had lived outside Rwanda since 1994 and worked with humanitarian organisations.

35-year-old businesswoman Diane Rwigara announced her candidacy, running as a critic of Kagame. Days after she launched her campaign, nude photos of Rwigara were leaked onto the Internet in an attempt to discredit her. On 7 July the National Electoral Commission disqualified Rwigara and two other candidates on technical grounds, alleging they had not collected enough valid signatures. The commission's decision was criticised by the US State Department and the European Union, while Amnesty International said that the election would be held in a "climate of fear and repression." 

Democratic Green Party of Rwanda leader Frank Habineza also declared his candidacy.

Results

Aftermath
Following his victory, Kagame was sworn in for his third presidential term on 18 August 2017.

References

Rwanda
Presidential
Rwanda
Presidential elections in Rwanda